Phycitodes binaevella is a species of snout moth described by Jacob Hübner in 1813. It is found in most of Europe (except Portugal), Asia Minor, Lebanon and the Palestinian Territories.

There is one generation with adults on wing from July to August.

The larvae feed on Cirsium vulgare, Carduus, Aster, Tanacetum vulgare and Artemisia vulgaris. They feed inside the flowerheads of their host plant. The species overwinters as a fully grown larva. Pupation takes place in spring in a cocoon on the soil surface.

References

Moths described in 1813
Moths of Asia
Phycitini
Moths of Japan
Moths of Europe
Taxa named by Jacob Hübner